Malik-Shah, also transliterated as Malek-Shah, Malikshah or Melikshah, may refer to:

 Malik-Shah I (1055–1092), sultan of Great Seljuq
 Malik-Shah II, grandson of Malik Shah I, sultan of Great Seljuq
 Malik-Shah III (1152–1153), sultan of Great Seljuq
 Malik Shah (Rûm) (1110–1116), sultan of the Seljuq Sultanate of Rûm